Proximity (typeset as ProXimity) is a 2000 American action thriller film starring Rob Lowe and James Coburn, produced by Overseas Entertainment for Warner Bros. Pictures handling theatrical and TV distribution and Columbia TriStar Home Entertainment for DVD distribution. It is written by Ben Queen and Seamus Ruane and directed by Scott Ziehl. The film is about an escaped prison convict (Lowe) and the head/founder (Coburn) of a support group called "Justice For The Victim's Families" who has his own tragic past and a dark secret.

Plot
When William Conroy (Rob Lowe) a former college professor is sentenced to life in prison for vehicular manslaughter it seems his life is over. But, when a fellow inmate tells him that in the past two years fourteen inmates have died at the prison, and then turns up dead the next day, Conroy is in more danger than he ever imagined. His suspicions are confirmed when, while on the way to his parole hearing, the van carrying the inmates crashes. Seizing the opportunity, Conroy flees the scene and elicits the help of his lawyer (Mark Boone Junior). What the two discover is a grisly murder ring set up within the prison walls that incriminates those at the highest levels of the correctional system.

Cast
Rob Lowe as William Conroy
Jonathan Banks as Price
Kelly Rowan as Anne Conroy
T. C. Carson as Yaskin
Joe Santos as Clive Plummer
Mark Boone Junior as Eric Hawthorne (Credited as Mark Boone, Jr.)
David Flynn as Lawrence
James Coburn as Jim Corcoran

External links

2000 films
2000 action thriller films
American action thriller films
Films about miscarriage of justice
Films shot in Cleveland
Films set in Cleveland
Films set in prison
2000s English-language films
Films directed by Scott Ziehl
2000s American films